Proportionality is a general principle in law which covers several separate (although related) concepts:
The concept of proportionality is used as a criterion of fairness and justice in statutory interpretation processes, especially in constitutional law, as a logical method intended to assist in discerning the correct balance between the restriction imposed by a corrective measure and the severity of the nature of the prohibited act.
Within criminal law, the concept is used to convey the idea that the punishment of an offender should fit the crime.
Under international humanitarian law governing the legal use of force in an armed conflict, proportionality and distinction are important factors in assessing military necessity.
Under the United Kingdom's Civil Procedure Rules, costs must be "proportionately and reasonably incurred", or "proportionate and reasonable in amount", if they are to form part of a court ruling on costs.

Proportionality as a general principle in law

History
A concept of proportionality that was testable in law was first developed in the High State Administrative Courts in Germany in the late 19th century, to review actions by the police.

European Union law

In European Union law there are generally acknowledged to be four stages to a proportionality test, namely,
 there must be a legitimate aim for a measure
 the measure must be suitable to achieve the aim (potentially with a requirement of evidence to show it will have that effect)
 the measure must be necessary to achieve the aim, that there cannot be any less onerous way of doing it
 the measure must be reasonable, considering the competing interests of different groups at hand

It is, however, often seen that the third and fourth criteria are often merged into one by the European Court of Justice, depending on the margin of discretion that the Court sees as being afforded to the member state. Examples are found in R (Seymour-Smith) v Secretary of State for Employment, where the ECJ points out that a member state has some discretion in the policies it pursues, surrounding unfair dismissal, in reducing unemployment. Further examples of the proportionality test are seen in Mangold v Helm and Kücükdeveci v Swedex GmbH & Co KG.

European Convention on Human Rights
In the European Convention on Human Rights, proportionality is one of main principles utilised by the European Court of Human Rights used for scrutinizing actions adopted by national authorities which restricts rights under the Convention - the other is the margin of appreciation.

Australia
While the European Union has placed a consistent focus on the proportionality test in the context of policy issues, namely human rights, the proportionality test in the Australian context is a matter of constitutional interpretation with respect to legislative power under the Constitution. Unlike Europe, the proportionality test as a means to characterize whether Commonwealth legislation falls under a head of power under section 51 of the Constitution of Australia, has attracted divergent viewpoints, in which Kirby J has remarked that the 'test has not enjoyed universal favour'. However, Owen Dixon CJ made clear that 'the question is essentially one of connexion, not appropriateness of proportionality, and where a sufficient connexion is established, it is not for the Court to judge whether the law is inappropriate or disproportionate'.

Criminal law
In criminal law, the principle of proportional justice is used to describe the idea that the punishment of a certain crime should be in proportion to the severity of the crime itself. In practice, systems of law differ greatly on the application of this principle. The principle of guilt is an absolute standard from which the 17th century Bloody Code of England emerged, which specified the death penalty even for minor crimes. In the 18th century Cesare Beccaria published On Crimes and Punishments which was to form the basis of penology based on the relative standard of culpability. 

As a result Jeremy Bentham developed the idea of the panopticon in which prisoners would simply be watched, rather than subjected to corporal punishment. The idea in practice became a cruel and ineffective corrective. In some systems, proportionality was interpreted as lex talionis, (an eye for an eye). In others, it has led to a more restrictive manner of sentencing: for example, all European Union countries have accepted as a treaty obligation that no crime warrants the death penalty, whereas some other countries in the world do use it.

In self-defense cases, the amount of force employed by the defender must be proportionate to the threatened aggressive force. If deadly force is used to defend against non-deadly force, the harm inflicted by the actor (death or serious bodily harm) will be greater than the harm avoided (less than serious bodily harm). Even if deadly force is proportionate, its use must be necessary. Otherwise, unlawful conduct will only be justified when it involves the lesser harm of two harmful choices. If countering with non-deadly force or with no force at all avoids the threatened harm, defensive use of deadly force is no longer the lesser evil of only two choices. Alternatives involving still less societal harm are available.

In United States Law, the United States Supreme Court proposed the Proportionality Doctrine in three cases during the 1980s, namely Enmund v. Florida (1982), Solem v. Helm (1983) and Tison v. Arizona (1987), to clarify this key principle of proportionality within the Cruel and Unusual Punishment Clause of the Eighth Amendment. The fundamental principle behind proportionality is that the punishment should fit the crime. In 1983, the U.S. Supreme Court ruled that courts must do three things to decide whether a sentence is proportional to a specific crime:

 Compare the nature and gravity of the offense and the harshness of the penalty,
 Compare the sentences imposed on other criminals in the same jurisdiction; i.e., whether more serious crimes are subject to the same penalty or to less serious penalties, and
 Compare the sentences imposed for commission of the same crime in other jurisdictions.

Proportionality is also present in other areas of municipal law in the United States, such as civil procedure. For example, it is embodied in Fed.R.Civ.P. 26(b)(2)(C), which considers whether the burden or expense of the proposed discovery outweighs its likely benefit.  Proportionality is a key consideration in the discovery process, and has been applied to e-discovery, where it has been attributed with significant cost-savings. It is likely that proportionality will be applied to new and developing areas of law, such as the law of legal technology.

International humanitarian law

The harm caused to civilians or civilian property must be proportional and not "excessive in relation to the concrete and direct military advantage anticipated" by an attack on a military objective.<ref name="military objective">Article 52 of Additional Protocol I to the Geneva Conventions provides a widely accepted definition of military objective: "In so far as objects are concerned, military objectives are limited to those objects which by their nature, location, purpose or use make an effective contribution to military action and whose total or partial destruction, capture or neutralization, in the circumstances ruling at the time, offers a definite military advantage", </ref>

Luis Moreno-Ocampo was the Chief Prosecutor at the International Criminal Court who investigated allegations of war crimes during the 2003 invasion of Iraq. He published an open letter containing his findings; in a section titled "Allegations concerning War Crimes", he elucidates this use of proportionality:

See also
 Civilian casualty ratio
 Convention on Cybercrime
 Let the punishment fit the crime
 R. v. Oakes [1986] 1 S.C.R. 103
 Ryuichi Shimoda et al. v. The State''
Strict scrutiny

Notes

References

External links

Law of war
International law
Legal doctrines and principles
European Union law